The men's road race at the 1935 UCI Road World Championships was the ninth edition of the event. The race took place on Sunday 18 August 1935 in Floreffe, Belgium. The race was won by Jean Aerts of Belgium.

Final classification

References

Men's Road Race
UCI Road World Championships – Men's road race